The Right to Love is a studio album by English jazz pianist/vocalist Liane Carroll and her fourth collaboration with jazz trumpeter and record producer James McMillan. Released in July 2017 by Quietmoney Recordings and distributed by Proper Records, it received four-starred reviews in The Observer and the Evening Standard.

Reception

Dave Gelly, reviewing The Right to Love in The Observer, gave the album four stars and said it displayed "a characteristic mixture of deceptive simplicity and emotional depth".

John Lewis, in a four-starred review for The Guardian, described it as "an elegant song suite... her elegant vocal improvisations eking new truths from familiar lyrics each time".

In another four-starred review, Jane Cornwell for the Evening Standard described the album as "bewitching" and "all the more affecting for the honesty with which she presents love songs written by everyone from Hoagy Carmichael to Jacques Brel and Tom Waits".
Charlie Anderson, for London Jazz News, said that "Liane Carroll and producer James McMillan have struck gold once again with an impressive album".

Cormac Larkin, writing in The Irish Times, also gave the album four stars and said that "McMillan’s deft, uncliched arrangements provide soulful settings for a unique voice in UK jazz, a lithe, joyous, fearless one that can strike that elusive balance between style and substance".

Track listing

Skylark 	
The Right To Love 	
It's A Fine Line 	
If You Go Away 	
You Don't Know What Love Is 	
Goin' Back 	
Lately 	
Georgia 	
In The Neighbourhood 	
I Get Along Without You Very Well

Personnel
 Liane Carroll (piano, vocals)
 Mark Edwards (piano)
 Malcolm Edmonstone (piano)
 Mark Jaimes (guitars)
Kirk Whalum (saxophone)
 Loz Garratt (bass)
 Roger Carey (bass)
 Ralph Salmins (drums)
 Russell Field (drums)
 James McMillan (trumpet)

References

External links
Liane Carroll: official website

2017 albums
Liane Carroll albums
Albums produced by James McMillan